Palpares caffer is a species of antlions in the family Myrmeleontidae, which is native to southern Africa. It was described by Hermann Burmeister in 1839.

Description
Palpares caffer is a relatively large antlion with a wing length of about 5 cm.

Distribution
This species occurs in South Africa from the Eastern Cape (Grahamstown area) northwards to Limpopo province. It has also been recorded in Namibia and Mozambique.

Habitat
It is fairly common in high-altitude grassland from 1,000 to 2,000 m above sea level.

Gallery

References

External links
Banks, N., 1913. The neuropterous genus Palpares. Annals of the Entomological Society of America, 6(2), pp.171-191.
Mansell, M.W. and Erasmus, B.F.N., 2002. Southern African biomes and the evolution of Palparini (Insecta: Neuroptera: Myrmeleontidae). Acta Zoologica Academiae Scientarium Hungarica, 48, pp.175-184.
Distribution map at the Global Biodiversity Information Facility (GBIF).

Myrmeleontidae
Insects of South Africa
Insects described in 1839